Paleu is a commune located in Bihor County, Crișana, Romania. It is composed of three villages: Paleu, Săldăbagiu de Munte (Hegyközszáldobágy) and Uileacu de Munte (Hegyközújlak). These were part of Cetariu Commune until 2003, when they were split off.

At the 2011 census, 74.2% of inhabitants were Hungarians and 25% Romanians.

References

Communes in Bihor County
Localities in Crișana